Choi Hee-seo (born Choi Moon-kyung on December 24, 1986) is a South Korean actress. She is best known for portraying anarchist Fumiko Kaneko in the 2017 historical film Anarchist from Colony. For this role, she set a record of winning eleven acting accolades in a single award season, whilst also achieving an unprecedented feat of winning both Best New Actress and Best Actress at the Grand Bell Awards.

Personal life 
Choi married her non-celebrity boyfriend on September 28, 2019, in a private ceremony.

Filmography

Film

Television series

Web series

Theater

Awards and nominations

Notes

References

External links
 
 
 

1987 births
Living people
South Korean television actresses
South Korean film actresses
South Korean stage actresses
21st-century South Korean actresses
Actresses from Seoul
Yonsei University alumni
Best New Actress Paeksang Arts Award (film) winners